Divi-Dead is a Japanese 2D adult game released by C's Ware in 1998. The game's theme falls into the category of adult horror, as it deals with supernatural and sexual topics. Certain images from the game are brutally violent and strange, while others are lighthearted and erotic. It is a visual novel that involves a supernatural mystery which the player solves in order to complete the game. The player makes certain decisions throughout the story, which may lead to different endings for the game. An English translation was released by Himeya Soft.

The game has been ported to the Dreamcast and PSP by homebrew community "Tales Translations", the group that's also behind the Spanish translation and fixing/replacing the Japanese map notations. German, Italian, French and Portuguese translations also exist, as well as a Flash version.

Plot
Life has been rough for Ranmaru Hibikiya. Bedridden as a child with a mysterious illness, he's had to spend most of his time alone, drugged, wondering if he would live to adulthood. Now, however, things are getting better for him. His health has improved; he only experiences the occasional
seizure. Also, he's been enrolled in his uncle's distinguished institution, the Asao Private School.

Of course, this fortuitous turn isn't without a catch. His uncle, a rather mysterious man, installed Ranmaru at Asao to serve as his spy. Ranmaru begins an innocuous investigation, not really expecting to find anything important. Soon, however, he finds himself immersed in horrifying, supernatural events that could claim his life at any moment.

References
 Official English product listing (Archived from the original on October 11, 2004)
 Screen shots and reviews in English
 

1998 video games
Bishōjo games
Eroge
Video games developed in Japan
Visual novels
Windows games
Windows-only games
Mystery video games